Marsal may refer to the following articles:
Marshal of the Russian Federation, the top rank (OF-10) in the Russian Federation's armed forces  
Marshal of the Soviet Union, the top rank (OF-10) in the Soviet Union's armed forces
Chief marshal of the branch, an OF9-rank in the Soviet Union's armed forces
Marshal of the branch, an OF9-rank in the Soviet Union's armed forces  
Generalfeldmaschall, the top rank (OF-10) in German-speaking armed forces

Marsal may refer also to the following places in France:
 Marsal, Moselle, a commune in the Moselle department
 Marsal, Tarn, a commune in the Tarn department